Géraldine Girod (born 24 February 1970 in Chamonix) is a French curler.

She participated in the demonstration curling events at the 1992 Winter Olympics, where the French women's team finished in seventh place.

Teams

References

External links

Living people
1970 births
People from Chamonix
Sportspeople from Haute-Savoie
French female curlers

Curlers at the 1992 Winter Olympics
Olympic curlers of France